Bassel al-Araj (1984 — 2017) was a Palestinian activist, writer and author. Known for his writings about revolution and Arab nationalism, al-Araj was killed on 6 March 2017 by a unit belonging to Israel’s Yamam police force, after a gunfight lasting nearly two hours broke out as they attempted to raid his home. He is known as "the educated martyr" among some Palestinian activists.

Biography 

Al-Araj was born in al-Walaja, a Palestinian village near Bethlehem. He worked as a pharmacist and organized educational activities and lectures in which he narrated experiences of Palestinian resistance in tours of Palestinian landmarks.

Along with five others, al-Araj was arrested by the Palestinian Authority in 2016 and charged with planning armed attacks against Israel. During their imprisonment in the PA-administered  prison, al-Araj and his companions claim that they were subject to torture and mistreatment, leading them to commence a hunger strike in demand of their freedom. During their nine-day hunger strike, al-Araj published a single sentence via his lawyer, "The da`i and the son of the da`i (one whose parents are unknown but someone claims him as his son) has required us to choose one of two: battle or humiliation. Far away we are from accepting humiliation" (Arabic: ألا إن الدعيّ بن الدعيّ قد ركز بين اثنتين، بين السّلة والذلّة.. وهيهات منّا الذلّة), a saying attributed to Husayn ibn Ali. Popular support for the men swelled, and the Palestinian courts ordered their release on bail of 500 Jordanian dinars. 

After their release from prison, Israeli  forces arrested several members of the group. al-Araj went into hiding for two months. Israeli forces tracked al-Araj and repeatedly served warrants authorizing them to search his family's home and properties.

Death 

The IDF located him on March 6, 2017, and surrounded him in an apartment near the Qaddura refugee camp in al-Bireh. He was engaged by the Israeli forces in a two-hour gunfight, during which the IDF fired an ENERGA anti-tank rifle grenade, resulting in the partial destruction of the building. Israeli forces stormed the building and murdered al-Araj after his ammunition was depleted, although Israeli reports state that al-Araj opened fire after IDF troops were already in the building. Palestinian reports note that Israeli forces removed al-Araj's corpse from the building by dragging him by his feet.

In a handwritten letter published posthumously, al-Araj appeared to predict his own death and placed it within the context of the struggle for Palestinian liberation. al-Araj's family reacted to Bassel's death by condemning not only Israeli forces for killing him but also the Palestinian Authority for their collusion with the latter. al-Araj's brother, Saeed, called his brother a hero, further saying "I am eternally proud of him... he lived in honor." al-Araj's mother, Siham, condemned both the state of Israel and the Palestinian Authority for their treatment of Bassel, claiming “Israeli soldiers killed him, but the PA paved the way for them." Similarly, Bassel's sister Doha condemned the state's media for abandoning Bassel and his comrades, and called the PA "complicit in Bassel’s killing".

In November 2018, Dar Rabal, a Palestinian publisher in Jerusalem, published the full works of al-Araj. The book's title, "I Have Found My Answers", was taken from the last letter he wrote prior to his death.

References

External links 
 Al-Araj's posthumously published will
 A series of blog postings written by al-Araj and published by the Palestinian Quds News Network (Arabic)
 Video Videos of al-Araj on one of his educational tours of Palestinian landmarks, published by the Arabi21 network (Arabic)

1984 births
2017 deaths
Palestinianists
Palestinian writers
Prisoners and detainees of the Palestinian National Authority